Allen Ralph Bushnell (July 18, 1833March 29, 1909) was an American attorney, politician, and Democratic member of Congress from the U.S. state of Wisconsin.  He also served as a Union Army officer in the American Civil War with the famous Iron Brigade of the Army of the Potomac.

Early life

Born in Hartford, Ohio, Bushnell attended the public schools of Hartford, and attended Oberlin and Hiram colleges in Ohio and studied law.  He moved to Grant County, Wisconsin, in 1854 and read law in the office of attorney Stephen O. Paine, in Platteville.  He taught school to help with his expenses, and, in December 1857, he was admitted to the Wisconsin Bar at Lancaster, Wisconsin.  He established his own legal practice in Platteville, which he maintained for the next four years.

In 1860, he was elected district attorney of Grant County, taking office in January 1861.  However, he served only a few months in the position; after the outbreak of the American Civil War, Bushnell resigned his office to volunteer for service with the Union Army.

Civil War service
He responded to President Abraham Lincoln's call for 75,000 volunteers, and was enrolled as a private in a company of militia known as the Platteville Guards, which afterward became Company C of the 7th Wisconsin Infantry Regiment.  At the time the regiment mustered into service, Bushnell was commissioned as first lieutenant of the company.

Upon arriving in the eastern theater of the war, the 7th Wisconsin Infantry was organized into a brigade under General Rufus King with the 2nd Wisconsin, 6th Wisconsin, and 19th Indiana regiments.  Their brigade soon became famous in the war as the Iron Brigade of the Army of the Potomac.  He rose to the rank of captain of Company C, fighting at the Second Battle of Bull Run and the Battle of Fredericksburg, and received an honorable discharge in 1863 due to medical disability.  After his discharge, he returned to Ohio, where he was under the care of his father for the next year.

Political career

He returned to Wisconsin in 1864 to resume the practice of law, but relocated from Platteville to Lancaster.  Shortly after returning to Wisconsin, his successor as Grant County district attorney, Joseph Trotter Mills, resigned after being elected to the Wisconsin circuit court judgeship.  Governor James T. Lewis appointed Bushnell to fill out the remainder of Mills' term as district attorney, expiring in January 1865.

He resumed his interest in politics with the Republican Party of Wisconsin, and, in 1871, he was elected to the Wisconsin State Assembly for Grant County's 2nd Assembly district, defeating James Wilson Seaton.  He served on the Assembly Committee on the Judiciary and the Joint Committee on Charitable and Penal Institutions.  After Lancaster was incorporated as a city in 1878, Bushnell was elected as its first mayor.

Despite his history in the Republican party, in 1876 he endorsed and campaigned for Democrat Samuel J. Tilden for President, due to his exasperation over the spending of the post-war years, and his contempt for the Republican political machine.  He subsequently became attached to the Democratic Party.  When Democrat Grover Cleveland became President in 1885, Bushnell was appointed United States Attorney for the Western District of Wisconsin, and ultimately served until a successor was appointed by President Benjamin Harrison, in 1890.

Later that year, he was the Democratic nominee for United States House of Representatives in Wisconsin's 3rd congressional district, and unseated Republican Robert M. La Follette in the wave election of 1890.  He moved his residence to Madison, Wisconsin, in 1891, before being sworn in to the 52nd United States Congress in March.  He became a proponent of silver-backed currency. His most lasting contribution was likely his support for a proposed constitutional amendment for the direct election of U.S. senators—the measure passed the House of Representatives, but failed in the Senate.  The concept would take another 20 years to be ratified as the Seventeenth Amendment to the United States Constitution.

The 1891 congressional redistricting significantly affected Bushnell, putting him in the same district as fellow incumbent Democrat Charles Barwig.  The party chose to renominate Barwig instead of Bushnell in the 1892 election, and Bushnell left office in March 1893.

Later years

He resumed the practice of law in Madison, and worked as counsel and treasurer for the Wisconsin Life Insurance Company.  He stood for office one final time, running for Wisconsin Supreme Court in 1906, but was defeated by attorney William H. Timlin in a four-way race.

He contracted pneumonia while attending his sister's funeral in Platteville, and died at his home in Madison on March 29, 1909.  He was interred at Hillside Cemetery, in Lancaster.

Personal life and family
Allen Bushnell was the son of Dr. George W. Bushnell and his wife Sarah ( Bates).  He was first married to Laura F. Burr and had three children with her before her death in 1873, though only one daughter survived infancy.  He subsequently married a cousin of Laura Burr, Mary P. Sherman, in 1875.  With Mary Sherman, he had at least three more children, though only one son, Alfred, survived childhood.

Electoral history

Wisconsin Assembly (1871)

| colspan="6" style="text-align:center;background-color: #e9e9e9;"| General Election, November 7, 1871

U.S. House of Representatives (1890)

| colspan="6" style="text-align:center;background-color: #e9e9e9;"| General Election, November 4, 1890

Wisconsin Supreme Court (1906)

| colspan="6" style="text-align:center;background-color: #e9e9e9;"| General Election, April 3, 1906

References

External links
 
 

|-

1833 births
1909 deaths
Hiram College alumni
Oberlin College alumni
Mayors of places in Wisconsin
Union Army officers
People of Wisconsin in the American Civil War
People from Platteville, Wisconsin
People from Licking County, Ohio
Democratic Party members of the United States House of Representatives from Wisconsin
19th-century American politicians
United States Attorneys for the Western District of Wisconsin
Democratic Party members of the Wisconsin State Assembly